The National Geoscience Database of Iran or in brief NGDIR is a scientific and research government agency in Iran which works in the field of Geology of Iran and centrally manages Geoscience data. This center was established in 1999 in the field of data collection authority with the aim of managing, preserving and sharing Geoscience data.

History
The core of the National Geoscience Database of Iran (NGDIR) was established in 1999 at the Geological Survey and Mineral Exploration of Iran and its main activities until 2000 is limited to collecting mineral information in the library of the organization and creating the first mineral database and collection and unification of map information in the Geological Survey and Mineral Exploration of Iran. In the same year, the creating of Geoscience Database task was assigned to the Ministry of Industries and Mines (Iran). Since then, the National Geoscience Database of Iran's structure became more independent and thematic development of its databases in the fields of Geology, Geography, Mining, Risk, etc. was put on its agenda. As the amount of information increased, the only way to provide the proper provision of information was to create a fully dynamic website. As a result, the site was designed so that it is possible to enter, edit and even manage information on the site without specifying the time and place on the Internet. In 2015, according to paragraph b, Article 157 of the Fifth Five-Year Development Plan of the Islamic Republic of Iran, based on launching a comprehensive database of geosciences and simultaneously increasing the activity of the Geological Survey and Mineral Exploration of Iran in interdisciplinary sciences and expanding its activities, objectives and procedures of the National Geoscience Database of Iran (NGDIR) were reviewed.

Organization chart
 National Geoscience Database of Iran (NGDIR)
 Recognition and standardization of geoscience data
 Database Center
 Geoscience information presentation system

Administrative structure
The National Geoscience Database of Iran (NGDIR) consists of the following administrative sections:

 Information presentation system
 Data cognition and standardization
 Database Center
 Information Technology Affairs
 Administration and services
 Geosciences Library
 Management Affairs

Strategic goals
The National Geoscience Database of Iran (NGDIR) pursues the following strategic goals:

 Focus on database maintenance cycles on making the most of available resources
 Maintenance of data and supply of geoscience of the country
 Prepare standards for data, products and processes in various fields of geoscience
 Validation and evaluation of data and products of geoscience
 Presenting data and products of geoscience from different portals and in line with modern technology in accordance with the needs of their stakeholders
 Research, compilation and dissemination of analytical and decision-making data models from geoscience data
 Implementing service orientation and mechanization geoscience database services
 Creating a life cycle for geoscience data and supplies
 Intellectual profitability and providing a unique identifier for geoscience supplies
 Effective and timely response to geoscience events
 Becoming a place of exchange of data and supplies of geoscience
 Providing a sustainable platform for interaction, reflection, exchange and gathering knowledge and opinions of those involved in geoscience
 Gain global credibility by providing data and achievements of the country's geoscience at the international level
 Monetize the power, experience, expertise, data and services available in the database
 Ensure the successful implementation of the activities of the database by providing the necessary legal bases

Data management process
The data management process in the National Geoscience Database of Iran (NGDIR) includes a cycle of data collection and retrieval, data storage and presentation standards. The first stage of data management includes recognizing and standardizing the data produced by different groups in the Geological Survey and Mineral Exploration of Iran. The output of the recognization and standardization section is the input of the database process. At this stage, the input data is evaluated and analyzed and then stored in a standard format in databases. The next stage is to provide information in which the data stored in the databases is presented as standard. The data life cycle does not end with the presentation of data because the data needs to be constantly updated to provide accurate and up-to-date information to users, so the data re-enters the cycle after update.

See also
 Geology of Iran
 Ministry of Industries and Mines (Iran)
 National Geographical Organization of Iran
 Information Technology Organization

References

External links
 National Geoscience Database of Iran profile on LinkedIn
 National Geoscience Database of Iran profile on APPOLO
 Iranian Journal of Earth Sciences
 WebGIS system of NGDIR
 Descriptive and documentary information management system of NGDIR
 Earth science images of NGDIR

Geology of Iran
Government agencies of Iran
Research institutes in Iran